Fighter Wing is a 1995 video game developed by Russian studio Gemsoft and published by Merit Studios for DOS.

Gameplay
Fighter Wing is a flight simulator for multiple players.

Reception
In 1996, Computer Gaming World declared Fighter Wing the 21st-worst computer game ever released.

Reviews
Computer Gaming World (Feb, 1995)
PC Gamer (Jun, 1995)
Joystick (French) - May, 1995
PC Games (Germany) - Jun, 1995
PC Player (Germany) - Jan, 1995

References

1995 video games
Combat flight simulators
DOS games
DOS-only games
Merit Studios games
Multiplayer and single-player video games
Video games developed in Russia